The Jaguar C-X16 is a concept hybrid electric sports car that was unveiled by Jaguar Cars at the 2011 Frankfurt Motor Show on 13 September. In April 2012, Jaguar announced that they will be manufacturing a new sports car based on the Jaguar C-X16 called the F-Type,  which was subsequently shown to the public (in non-hybrid form) at the Paris Motor Show in September 2012.

Design

The car body is constructed from aluminium, and is said by Jaguar to be the smallest car that they have made since the XK120 of 1954.  The drivetrain comprises a hybrid unit, combining a   supercharged 3-litre V6 petrol engine with a   electric motor and an eight-speed ZF automatic transmission.  The battery pack, which is mounted behind the front seats, is charged using a brake regeneration system.  The car can run on engine alone, motor alone or on both in combination.  Under engine power, the electric motor can also be activated to boost acceleration, in a similar way to the KERS system used in Formula 1 cars, by using a switch on the steering wheel.

Styling
The C-X16 form takes cues from Jaguar's 2010 C-X75 plug-in hybrid concept supercar, including the shape of the front grille and the wrap-around rear lights, and has a side-hinged opening rear window reminiscent of the 1961 E-Type.

Performance
The CO2 rating is 165 g/km.

References

External links

Jaguar C-X16 Official Website

C-X16
Cars introduced in 2011
Hybrid electric cars
Sports cars
Coupés
Rear-wheel-drive vehicles